Neponset River Reservation is a Massachusetts state reservation along the Neponset River in the towns of Milton and Dorchester, near where the river flows through an estuary into the Boston Harbor.  It is adjacent to the Dorchester-Milton Lower Mills Industrial District along the River. This was some of the last land retained by Cutshamekin (Massachusett) before he deeded much of the land comprising Dorchester and Milton to English colonists in the 17th century. 

In February 2022, Massachusetts Governor Charlie Baker announced an $8.2 million project to construct a 0.7-mile shared-use path from Tenean Beach on the reservation to Morrissey Boulevard. It will connect the Boston Harborwalk with Neponset via Morrissey (including a 670-foot boardwalk in the salt marshes near the National Grid gas tank). The project will be one funded under the $9.5 billion in federal funds the state government received under the Infrastructure Investment and Jobs Act. 

In March 2022, the United States Environmental Protection Agency (EPA) placed 3.7 miles of the Neponset River, between Mother Brook in Hyde Park to the Lower Mills, on the National Priorities List of the Superfund program for remediation due to sediment containing elevated levels of PCBs.

References

External links
Official Website

Neponset River